Leionema carruthersii is a  small shrub that is endemic to southern New South Wales in Australia. It has mostly greenish-yellow flowers, distinctive stamens and lance to egg-shaped leaves.

Description
The leaves are widely spread with a short petiole and the  surface is scantily covered with soft, fine, individual hairs. The flowers are borne at the end of branches arising from  the leaf axils or bracts. The calyces are long, cone-shaped with small, triangular lobes. Flowering occurs in winter.

Taxonomy and naming
Leionema carruthersii was first formally described in 1998 by Paul G. Wilson and the description was published in the journal Nuytsia.The specific epithet (carruthersii) derivation is not known for certainty, but may have been named after Sir Joseph Carruthers who was a former Premier of New South Wales.

Distribution and habitat
This species has a restricted distribution from  Batemans Bay to Bega on the New South Wales south coast, growing in sclerophyll forests on granite outcrops.

References 

carruthersii
Sapindales of Australia
Flora of New South Wales
Taxa named by Ferdinand von Mueller